The 1970 Speedway World Team Cup was the 11th edition of the FIM Speedway World Team Cup to determine the team world champions.

The final took place at Wembley Stadium in London. The title was won by Sweden for the sixth time.

Qualification

British Round
Great Britain seeded to Final (Commonwealth riders eligible for British team)

Scandinavian Round
 June 14
  Västervik
 Att: 1,450

* Sweden to Final

Continental Quarterfinal
 June 21
  Crikvenica

 	

* Czechoslovakia and Yugoslavia to Continental Semifinal

Continental Quarterfinal
 June 21
  Ruhpolding

 	

* East Germany and Hungary to Continental Semifinal

Tournament

Continental Semifinal
 July 5
  Gustrow
 Att: 12,000
Draw 1.  →  B

 	

* East Germany and Czechoslovakia to Continental Final

Continental Final
 July 26
  Slaný
 Att: 7,000

* Czechoslovakia and Poland to Final

World Final
 September 19
  London, Wembley Stadium
 Att: 35,000

See also
 1970 Individual Speedway World Championship
 1970 Speedway World Pairs Championship

References

1970
World T